Vaaname Ellai is a 1992 Indian Tamil language drama film written and directed by K. Balachander, starring Anand Babu, Ramya Krishnan, Madhoo, Vishali Kannadasan, Rajesh and Babloo Prithiveeraj. The story involves five characters from different backgrounds, who get vexed with their lives, jointly decide to end their lives together, but begin a short journey of 100 days to live together happily before dying.

The story of Vaaname Ellai was conceived after Balachander became upset learning of numerous suicides inspired by his own film Ek Duuje Ke Liye (1981), and was convinced he could make a film speaking against suicide. The film was released on 22 May 1992, and Balachander won the Filmfare Award for Best Director – Tamil.

Plot 

Five young people decide that life is not worth living anymore for various reasons.

Deepak, the son of a judge K. Manjunath is an idealist and never suspects that the many gifts that are showered upon him by his father were things received as bribes. One day he shoots a video song about corruption in society, dressed as a robot. Seeing this, his friend remarks that his own father is very corrupt. The angered Deepak beats up his friend and challenges him that if that were true, he would commit suicide out of shame. Back at home, he sees his father taking a large amount of money as bribe for a lawsuit. The shocked Deepak argues with his father over his corrupt practices. His mother starts justifying corruption which has brought the family luxuries like the bungalow, car and Anand's Yamaha bike. Besides, a large amount of money is needed for the marriage dowry of their two daughters (Anand's sisters). Anand is unable to bear this and immediately sets fire to his new Yamaha bike. He leaves home.

Gautham is the only son of a rich businessman, M. R. T. He is motherless. He is in love with the computer operator, Suguna working in his father's office. He is happy-go-lucky. One day his father learns of their love and despises it as he has big plans to marry his son to the daughter of a rich, potential business partner. He threatens Gautham to not marrying Suguna. But the much pampered Gautham is adamant in marrying her. Meanwhile, Akhila, the widowed mother of Suguna also objects to their love, fearing for problems arising due to the difference in their social status. M. R. T. comes up with a plan to stop the couple from marrying. He convinces Akhila in remarrying him, thereby making Gautham and Suguna as step-siblings. The couple is heartbroken. Babloo wants to commit suicide, but Suguna wants to continue to live as the new step-daughter of the rich businessman. She soon shows her own brand of revenge by heavy partying and boozing and having one night stands. Whenever arrested, she proudly proclaims being the rich man's daughter.

Madhoo was forced into marriage with a very rich but old man and Ramya is a gang-rape victim. The other is a poor unemployed youth of high caste who does not get employment because of caste based reservation despite scoring very high marks in college

They all meet at the suicide point and decide to live a happy life for 100 days and then end it all. In those 100 days, they have all sorts of fun. They also sing mourning songs for their own death. But one of them, the unemployed, secretly tries to change his friends' minds away from suicide. But they tell that their mind is made up and he can leave if he chooses to. But he sets his suicide earlier and informs them that he did so to make them realise that death is no joke and if his friends changed their minds, his death would not be in vain. They soon start getting doubts about going ahead with their suicides.

Meanwhile, they find a baby at their doorstep and have no choice but to take care of the child. They get emotionally close to the child. Finally the dead friend's dad comes and meets them having tracked his son's letters with great difficulty. When informed of his son's death he mourns and accuses the remaining youths of being the cause of his death. The four decide to die immediately on hearing this. As they go to the suicide point, they meet their dead friend there. He says that he had faked his own death as well as arranged for the child and his father to dissuade them. His father takes the child to an orphanage and they meet people with various physical deformities trying to live a fruitful and cheerful life. After gaining inspiration from many of the disabled persons who had achieved things and also from the advice they give them, the five youths decide to life a long and brave life.

Cast 
Anand Babu as Deepak
Babloo Prithveeraj as Gautam
Madhoo as Karpagam
Ramya Krishnan as Subathra
Gowtham Sundararajan as Pasupathy
Charle as Sabu
Kavithalaya Krishnan as Babu
Dhamu as Chevvaa
Madhan Bob as Paa. Dhi. Pandiyan
Vishali Kannadasan as Suguna
Bhanupriya as Herself
Cochin Haneefa as M.R.T., Gautam's father
Rajesh as Samyvelu, Pasupathy's father
H. Ramakrishnan as Gandhiraman
Chithra as Sundari, Gandhiraman's sister
Sethu Vinayagam as K. Manjunath, Deepak's father
Poovilangu Mohan as Deepak's friend
Y. Vijaya as Akhila, Suguna's mother
S. N. Lakshmi as Sabu and Babu's mother

Production 
After the release of Ek Duuje Ke Liye (1981), Balachander was upset on learning of numerous people wanting to commit suicide the way it happened in the film. Lakshmi Vijayakumar, a psychiatrist, suggested he make a film showing "the thought of suicide in a positive light — to go through struggle, but overcome it and realise that life is worth living". This laid the foundation for Vaaname Ellai. The film marked the acting debut of actors Madhan Bob and Dhamu as a comedian who went on to become popular. Bob had been recommended to Balachander by his father's friend.

Soundtrack 
Tamil (original) version

The music was composed by Maragadha Mani, with lyrics by Vairamuthu. He later reused the tune of "Kambangadu" as "Gundu Soodi" for the Telugu film Chatrapathi (2005). The tune of "Jana Gana Mana" was later adapted by Maragadha Mani as "Yedavaku" for the Telugu film S. P. Parasuram.

Telugu (dubbed) version

The film was dubbed into Telugu as October 2 and all lyrics were written by Rajasri.

Release and reception 
Vaaname Ellai was released on 22 May 1992. On the same day, N. Krishnaswamy of The Indian Express wrote, "Given the varied nature of characters at hand, the treatment at first has got to be episodic but Balachander's vibrant style of telling a tale keeps reels crackling". K. Vijiyan of New Straits Times called it a "must-see picture for youth". Kutty Krishnan of Kalki praised Balachander for delivering a message against suicide. The film won the Tamil Nadu State Film Award Special Prize for Best Film, and Balachander won the Best Story Writer award at the same ceremony. Balachander also won the Filmfare Award for Best Director – Tamil.

References

External links 

1990s Tamil-language films
1992 drama films
1992 films
Films about suicide
Films directed by K. Balachander
Films scored by M. M. Keeravani
Films with screenplays by K. Balachander
Indian drama films